The 2020 Wheeling, West Virginia municipal election was held on June 9, 2020, to elect members of the city council and mayor.

Background

On April 7, 2020, legislation was proposed at a virtual city council meeting to postpone Wheeling's municipal election from May 12 to June 9, to coincide with West Virginia's primary election.

Mayor

City council

Ward 1

Ward 2

Ward 3

On July 12, 2019, Ketchum announced that she would seek elected to the Wheeling city council from Ward 3. On June 9, 2020, she won the election against Peggy Niebergall, Jerome Henry, and Erick Marple, becoming the first transgender person elected to political office in West Virginia. Following her victory she was praised by Annise Parker, the former Mayor of Houston, Texas, and congratulated by GLAAD.

Ward 4

Ward 5

References

Wheeling, West Virginia municipal
Wheeling, West Virginia
Local elections in West Virginia